"Cold Snap" is the first episode of the American television miniseries Dexter: New Blood, a continuation of the series Dexter. The episode was written by series developer Clyde Phillips from a story by Phillips and Adam Rapp and directed by executive producer Marcos Siega. It originally aired on Showtime on November 7, 2021, being also available on its streaming service at midnight on the same day.

The series follows Dexter Morgan after having faked his death on the original series finale. Dexter now lives in the fictional small town of Iron Lake, New York, hiding his identity under the name of Jim Lindsay, a local shopkeeper and having suppressed his killing urges. He is now in a relationship with Angela Bishop, the town's chief of police, and is beloved and respected in the town. A local troublemaker and the arrival of a mysterious person cause friction in his new life, as the past comes back to haunt him.

Development on the series started following the negative reception to the original series finale on 2013. Showtime president David Nevins said that a potential follow-up to the series was ongoing in 2014 but no further updates were mentioned. Showtime contacted Clyde Phillips, the showrunner for the first four seasons, in 2019 to start working on a potential revival of the series. The series was announced in October 2020, with Phillips and Hall confirming their return. Despite being a follow-up to the eighth season, Phillips did not consider the series as a ninth season since there was a major discontinuity in the serialization of the story.

According to Nielsen Media Research, the episode was seen by an estimated 0.678 million household viewers and gained a 0.2 ratings share among adults aged 18–49. It was, however, watched by 2.2 million viewers across linear and streaming platforms, becoming the most-watched Showtime title ever on OTT. Critical reception to the episode was mixed. Critics praised Michael C. Hall's performance and deemed the episode a return to form following a disappointing finale. Others criticized the episode's writing, with many finding it predictable and lacking surprises, and many deemed that the series felt "pointless".

Plot
In Iron Lake, New York, Dexter Morgan (Michael C. Hall), going by the name Jim Lindsay, is running through the snowy woods, attempting to hunt a stag. When he finds him, a rare albino stag, he is unable to shoot him and leaves for his cabin. At his remote cabin, he briefly talks with an imaginary iteration of his sister Debra (Jennifer Carpenter), before she disappears.

On his way into town, Dexter is stopped by Angela Bishop (Julia Jones), the small town's chief of police, and it is revealed that they're in a relationship. They have sex in Angela's car before Angela is called for a minor case, forcing her to leave. Dexter heads into town where he works as a shopkeeper at Fred's Fish & Game. A young customer, Matt Caldwell (Steve M. Robertson), arrives to buy a knife and hunting rifle. While Dexter sells him the knife, he must wait 24 hours before buying the rifle as his FBI background check is flagged. Although disappointed, Matt calmly leaves with the knife.

That night, Dexter goes on a date with Angela at a bar. Their date is interrupted when Angela's daughter invites friends to her house, forcing Angela to leave early. At the bar, Dexter is approached again by Matt. Although Dexter reiterates that he can't get him the rifle early, Matt invites him to a party the next day at his father's house. A mysterious hitchhiker (Jack Alcott) soon arrives at the town and takes an interest in Dexter. The next day, Dexter goes hunting again but feels he is being watched, finding footsteps in the snow. He expresses his concerns to Debra, but she tells him to adhere to his new life.

Petrol billionaire Edward Olsen (Fredric Lehne) is in town, intending to open a business, which is met with backlash from many townspeople. Dexter's boss, Fred Jr. (Michael Cyril Creighton), tells him to give Matt the rifle as his records were cleared, and has Dexter deliver it himself. Dexter arrives at the party, where Matt's friend Bill takes him upstairs to see Matt. They are forced to leave the room when they find him having sex. Bill then snorts cocaine and tells Dexter that he and Matt were involved in a boat accident, which resulted in many deaths. In exchange for money, Bill covered for Matt, but his guilt and treatment by the townspeople are destroying him emotionally. Realizing his mistake, he asks Dexter not to tell anyone. Dexter delivers the rifle to Matt and briefly considers attacking him before just leaving the house.

Returning to his cabin, Dexter finds someone inside and sneaks up behind in order to attack him with an axe. He confronts the mysterious person, who reveals himself to be his son Harrison. Debra reminds Dexter of all the deaths that plagued his previous life (Doakes, LaGuerta, Rita, and Debra herself), telling him not to get involved with Harrison's life. Dexter claims not to be the man he is looking for and gives him money to leave the town. As Harrison leaves, Dexter stares at a photo of both when he was a baby and decides to burn it.

Dexter once again hunts the stag and eventually finds him. Instead of shooting him, he approaches the stag and pets it. Suddenly, the stag is shot by a gleeful Matt, to Dexter's shock. Dexter finally snaps and hits Matt in the head with his rifle, knocking him out. His "Dark Passenger" suddenly returns, noting it's been a long time since he felt the need. He covers the interior of his shed with plastic and straps a naked Matt to a table. He confronts Matt about the stag and the boat accident. Matt confesses his part but defends his actions, blaming his troubled childhood. When Dexter claims he will still kill him, Matt angrily states that his father will kill Dexter when he finds out. Nevertheless, Dexter stabs Matt in the chest, killing him.

Dexter stores Matt's blood on a makeshift microscopic slide but decides to drop it with the corpse. He chops up Matt's body, placing it in bags, despite Deb's insistence to stop. He then drives to the town, finding Harrison just as he is about to leave town. He confesses to being his father and decides to take him home. As they enter the house, blood trails are seen outside his cabin.

Production

Development

On October 14, 2020, the Dexter revival was ordered as a limited series consisting of 10 episodes, starring Hall in his original role, with Phillips returning as showrunner. On November 17, 2020, it was announced Marcos Siega was set to direct the first six episodes of the limited series as well as serving as an executive producer alongside Hall, John Goldwyn, Sara Colleton, Bill Carraro, and Scott Reynolds. In July 2021, it was announced that the series would premiere on November 7, 2021, on Showtime. In the United Kingdom, the series premiered on November 8, 2021, on Sky Atlantic.

In November 2021, it was announced that the first episode of the revived series would be titled "Cold Snap", and was directed by Marcos Siega and written by series developer Clyde Phillips from a story by Phillips and Adam Rapp. The episode marked Phillips' first writing credit for the series since the season 4 premiere, "Living the Dream", and was his fifth writing credit for the series.

Writing

Phillips recognized the ending had suited the time when it was broadcast, as around 2013, there were a number of real-life serial killers known to be living in Oregon and nearby states. Phillips also considered that by surrounding himself with chainsaws, Dexter was under a constant reminder about how his mother had died. As Phillips was unsure of the intent that the finale was meant to deliver, he decided to incorporate a major timeskip, nearly a decade from the end of events of the original series. While Dexter is still a lumberjack, he had since moved to the fictional town of Iron Lake, New York. Because of that, Phillips did not consider the miniseries as a ninth season, since there was a major discontinuity in the serialization of the story. As the writing staff wrote out the ten-episode miniseries, they established how the series would end and wrote backwards from that.

Phillips described the intention of skipping Dexter's narrations for most of the episode, "it makes the character accessible, vulnerable, it's also a great chance for humor. And to not have that as a tool in our toolbox, made it more challenging to write that first episode, but it's so worth the satisfaction of when he finally does talk and when 'tonight's the night' comes back."

Describing Dexter snapping and returning to his old persona, Hall explained, "Matt destroys this manifestation of Dexter's aspiration of purity. He shoots this deer at a time when it's the last thing Dexter has to hold on to. He's obviously been struggling with Matt and has felt tempted. I imagine when temptations like that have emerged in the past that maybe Dexter's left town, that he's moved on. But in this case he doesn't." Hall also felt it was important to explore Dexter's relationship with his son Harrison, "the richness of that relationship and that exploration is a big part of what we're up to, and a big part of why this felt like a story worth telling. It felt like the right time."

Casting
The announcement of the series in October 2020 confirmed Michael C. Hall's return as Dexter Morgan. In January 2021, Julia Jones, Alano Miller, Johnny Sequoyah, Jack Alcott, and David Magidoff joined the main cast. In February 2021, Oscar Wahlberg was cast in recurring roles.

In July 2021, it was announced that original series regular Jennifer Carpenter would reprise her role as Dexter's sister Debra in some capacity for the limited series. On August 24, 2021, it was reported that Carpenter is confirmed to reprise her role as a series regular, appearing as Dexter's  "imaginary iteration of Debra". Hall described her return, "I don't think of her as a ghost per se, but more of a link or an echo or an inconvenient truth for Dexter. She comes back to sort of haunt and punish and caretake and provoke and love him." He further described her, "She's not bound by who we know Deb to be. She's an energy that's embodied by Deb, but she isn't bound by anything other than whatever emotional or psychological riptide is going on in Dexter's own head."

Filming
Production began in February 2021, with most of the show filmed in Shelburne Falls, Massachusetts, serving as a stand-in for Iron Lake. Exterior filming had to be coordinated around the weather, as the creators wanted to have a significant amount of snow in those shots, including a local frozen lake. Interior filming started around July 2021 over a fifty-day period.

Reception

Viewers
In its original American broadcast, "Cold Snap" was seen by an estimated 0.678 million household viewers and gained a 0.20 ratings share among adults aged 18–49, according to Nielsen Media Research. This means that 0.20 percent of all households with televisions watched the episode. This was a 76% decrease in viewership from the original series finale, which was watched by 2.80 million viewers with a 1.3 in the 18-49 demographics.

According to Showtime, the episode was watched by 2.2 million viewers across linear and streaming platforms, becoming the most-watched Showtime title ever on OTT and it was the year's most-watched scripted drama season premiere telecast among premium channels. By December 2021, it was estimated that 8.2 million viewers had watched the episode through linear and streaming platforms.

Critical reviews
"Cold Snap" received mixed to positive reviews from critics. Matt Fowler of IGN gave the episode a "great" 8 out of 10 and wrote in his verdict, "Dexter returns, reborn with a few tweaks and fidgets to the formula, but not so as to mask the malicious fun of the hallmarks from the old show that return anew under original showrunner Clyde Phillips. Michael C. Hall slips effortlessly back into his old sociopath role as time away, and change of scenery, has done wonders to revitalize this once-omnipresent pop culture icon. 'Cold Snap' is a great and grisly opener for New Blood, setting the stage and delivering a Dexter Morgan doing his damndest to remain chaste on the murder front. Whether or not, contextually, this is all just a shot at a do-over feels irrelevant because New Blood's mix of old and new holds a ton of promise."

Richard Lawson of Vanity Fair wrote, "Dexter: New Blood is a surprisingly welcome return to the franchise's brand of heady nonsense, self-conscious but not overly precious about its meta awareness." Kelly McClure of Vulture gave the episode a 3 star out of 5 rating and wrote, "Hunting is assuredly a terrible thing, but if it takes something as relatively minor as that to break Jim's edge, then it seems like his dark passenger has an even stronger grip on him now than before. To take it back to edging, that's the conflict with pleasure delaying. Depriving yourself of something you really REALLY want makes it all the better when you finally let yourself gorge. And then you just want more." Nick Harley of Den of Geek gave the episode a 3 star out of 5 rating and wrote, "Overall, 'Cold Snap' doesn't introduce any new wrinkles or compelling ideas that show this return is warranted. I'm open to subsequent episodes proving me wrong, but so far this reeks of Showtime thumbing through its old IP for relevancy. Dexter is back, but only time will tell whether that's a good thing." Lorraine Ali of Los Angeles Times wrote, "Tension and logistical nightmares create high drama as the story branches into several mysteries and crises: missing and slain Indigenous women, another potential apex predator and a new generation of killers in the making."

Other reviews were more negative. Joshua Alston of The A.V. Club gave the episode a "C−" grade and wrote, "The vicariously violent version of this show simply won't hunt, not in 2021, with so many antihero stories that confront rather than conveniently dodge the moral quandaries such a character creates. Hopefully the unpleasantness with Matthew will prove an unsavory means to an elegant end. This is, after all, definitely Dexter's last shot at one." Alan Sepinwall of Rolling Stone wrote, "New Blood seems simultaneously designed to appeal to all of those constituencies and none of them. It is competently told but a bit dull. And, like its title character at this stage of his life, it seems too conflicted about all this blood and gore to enjoy any of it." Benji Wilson of The Daily Telegraph gave the episode a 3 star out of 5 rating and wrote, "Assessing its merits is a nettlesome task: there's the matter of whether it's a decent TV show, but then there's also the matter of whether it should have been resurrected at all."

References

External links
 "Cold Snap" at Showtime
 

Dexter: New Blood episodes
2021 American television episodes
Television episodes directed by Marcos Siega